The Evangelistic Association of the East is a registered Non-governmental organization headquartered at Perumbavoor, Kerala working in the Educational, Social Service and Spirituality sectors.
The organization has Educational Institutions, Orphanages and an Arch Diocese affiliated with Syriac Orthodox Church across South India. It was founded as the first missionary association of Syriac Orthodox Church in 1924 by 'Malphono Nasiho' Geevarghese Cor-Episcopa Athunkal(1902-1997) and later registered in 1949 under Indian Societies Registration Act. XXI of 1860.
The E.A.E Arch Diocese is under the direct control of Ignatius Aphrem II, Patriarch օf the Syriac Orthodox Church․

Educational Institutions

In Kerala 

 Mar Stephen Vocational Higher Secondary School, Valakom, Kunnackal P.O. Muvattupuzha.
 St. Thomas Higher Secondary School, Kelakom P.O. Thalassery, Kannur.
 P. E. M. High School Thiruvanchoor P.O Kottayam Dist.
 Uppukandom A.G.C.M.U.P. School, Airoorpadam P.O. Thrikkariyoor, Kothamangalam. Ernakulam Dist.
 Emmanuvel Upper Primary School, Kayanadu P.O. Muvattupuzha. Ernakulam Dist.
 St. Mary's Lower Primary School, Plamudy P.O. Kothamangalam, Ernakulam Dist.
 Santhom Public School, Thungali, Vengoor P.O. Perumbavoor, Ernakulam Dist.

In Karnataka 

  St. George Pre-University College, Nelliyady. P.O., South Kanara, Karnataka State. St. George High School, Nelliyady. P.O., South Kanara, Karnataka State.
 St. George English Medium High School, Nellyady, South Kanara, Karnataka.
 St. George U.P.School, N. R. Pura P.O, Chikmagalur, Karnataka.

EAE Archdiocese of the Syriac Orthodox Church
 Churches: 31
 Dayra: St. Thomas Mount, Chooramudy Dayara, Perumbavoor
 Chapels: 17
in Kerala and Karnataka under the E.A.E. Archdiocese.
St. Thomas Church Malankarakunnu is the oldest church in Wayanad Kerala was of E.A.E Archdiocese, now under Malabar Diocese.

In Kerala 

 St. George’s Emmanuel Church Peruva, Karikkode, Kottayam
 St. George’s Church, Aralam, Kannur
 St. George’s Church, Kozhichal, Kannur
 St. Mary’s Soonoro Church Kottamala, Kasargode
 St. Mary’s Soonoro Syriac Orthodox Pilgrim Church Meenangadi, Wayanad
 St. Mary's Soonoro Church, Kelakam
 St. Behanam's Church, Cheeral, Wayanad
 St. Thomas Edessa Church Nedungapra, Perumbavoor
 St. George's Church Padanakkad, Kasargode
 St. George's Church Manjakkadu, Kannur
 St. John's Church Poovathinkad, Kannur
 St. George's Church Anakkal, Malampuzha, Palakkad
 St. George's Church Sharonkunnu, Pothanikkad, Kothamangalam, Ernakulam
 St.Mary's Church Kattikkayam, Thodupuzha, Idukki 
 St.Mary's Congregation, Thodupuzha

In Karnataka 
 St. George's Church, Narasimharajapura
 St. Paul's Church, Muthinkoppa, Narasimharajapura
 St. Ignatius Church Susalavani, Narasimharajapura
 St. George's & St.John's Church Karugunda, Narasimharajapura
 St. Mary's Church, Vorkatte, Narasimharajapura
 St. Baselios Church, Gubbiga, Narasimharajapura
 St. Mary's Soonoro Church, Renjiladi, Puttur
 St. Thomas Church, Nelliyadi
 St. George’s Church, Addahole
 St. George’s Church Shibaje, Belthangady
 St. Simon's Church Ichilampady, Puttur
 St. Mary's Church, Kunthoor, Perabe 
 St. Mary's Church, Hubli
 St. Mary's Church Kakkinje, Belthangady
 St. Mary's Church Beluvai, Udupi

References

External links
 Official Website: https://www.eae1924.org
 Facebook Page: https://www.facebook.com/EAE1924/

Syriac Orthodox Church
Syriac Orthodox dioceses
Organisations based in India
Non-governmental organizations
1924 establishments in India